George Rosling (December 22, 1900 – April 16, 1973) was a United States district judge of the United States District Court for the Eastern District of New York.

Education and career

Born in New York City, New York, Rosling received an Artium Baccalaureus degree from Columbia University in 1920. He received a Bachelor of Laws from Brooklyn Law School in 1923. He was in private practice of law in New York City from 1924 to 1960. He was a Justice of the City Court of the City of New York (now the New York City Civil Court) from 1960 to 1961.

Federal judicial service

Rosling received a recess appointment from President John F. Kennedy on October 5, 1961, to the United States District Court for the Eastern District of New York, to a new seat authorized by 75 Stat. 80. He was nominated to the same position by President Kennedy on January 15, 1962. He was confirmed by the United States Senate on March 16, 1962, and received his commission on March 17, 1962. His service terminated on April 16, 1973, due to his death in New York City.

See also
List of Jewish American jurists

References

Sources
 

1900 births
1973 deaths
Judges of the United States District Court for the Eastern District of New York
United States district court judges appointed by John F. Kennedy
20th-century American judges
Columbia University alumni
Brooklyn Law School alumni
20th-century American lawyers